Barbara Farrell Vucanovich (June 22, 1921 – June 10, 2013) was an American Republican politician who was the first Latina elected to the United States House of Representatives, in which she served representing Nevada from 1983 to 1997.

Background
Vucanovich was born in Camp Dix, New Jersey. Her father, Thomas Farrell, who hailed from Troy, New York, was of Irish ancestry.  Between the world wars he was the chief engineer for the New York State Department of Public Works, and during World War II rejoined the United States Army to become Deputy Commanding General of the Manhattan Project. Vucanovich's mother, Maria Ynez White, was of English and Mexican ancestry from southern California, with her maternal great-grandmother having been a Mexican who became a U.S. citizen upon the transfer of California to the United States in 1848.

Vucanovich grew up in the capital city of Albany, New York. She married James Henry Bugden at the age of 18 but became separated when her husband was assigned overseas during the war. She was employed by several New York businesses during the 1940s. In 1949, she moved to Reno, Nevada and obtained a divorce. In 1950 she married Kenneth Dillon, a founding partner in the law firm Vargas, Dillon, and Bartlett. Their children were Patricia, Michael, Kenneth, Thomas, and Susan. Widowed in 1964, she married George Vucanovich in 1965. They met while working on Paul Laxalt's unsuccessful campaign in 1964 for the U.S. Senate. George died of leukemia in 1998.

Political career
Vucanovich's second husband, Ken Dillon, introduced her to Nevada Republican politics in the 1950s, when the party was slowly building after decades of minority status. Dillon introduced her to Paul Laxalt, then a young district attorney from Carson City. After working on Laxalt's gubernatorial campaigns and his razor-close win in the senatorial election over Democrat Harry Reid in 1974, Vucanovich was hired as the district director for the newly elected Senator. When Nevada was split into two congressional districts after 1980 United States Census, Laxalt urged Vucanovich to run for the 2nd District, which included the entire state outside of Las Vegas.

She won her first term with the slogan, "What Congress needs is a tough grandmother." Her tenure extended from 1983 until her retirement in 1997. She faced serious opposition once, in 1992, when Bill Clinton won the electoral votes of Nevada over George Herbert Walker Bush, Vucanovich's choice. She won just 48% of the vote to 43% to Reno mayor Pete Sferrazza. Shortly after taking office in 1983, she was diagnosed and had surgery for breast cancer. Motivated in part by her own experience, Vucanovich supported funding for early screening, detection and treatment of breast cancer. She supported equal pay and equal treatment for women. She was a supporter of capital punishment.

Vucanovich served for many years on the House Interior Committee, of which she eventually became the ranking Republican on the Mining and Minerals Subcommittee. She also served on the House Administration Committee until her appointment in 1991 to the Appropriations Committee. She became Chairwoman of the Subcommittee on Military Construction when the Republicans gained control of the House of Representatives in 1995. Vucanovich authored the repeal of the 55 mph speed limit, particularly popular in the American West and a measure to prevent more than one state from taxing pensions and retirement benefits.  She campaigned for her seventh term by opposing Clinton administration tax increase proposals on casinos.

She launched a campaign to become Secretary of the Republican Conference shortly after Congressman Bob Michel announced he would not seek another term. Michel's retirement created several vacancies in the Republican leadership as Newt Gingrich of Georgia and others jockeyed for higher positions. Despite having been a member of the Conservative Opportunity Society, a group led by subsequent Speaker Gingrich with the goal of achieving Republican control of the House, Vucanovich faced serious opposition in her leadership bid from Tim Hutchinson, a second-term member from Arkansas. She prevailed in a close contest for secretary after a rousing nomination speech by Henry Hyde (R-IL), a friend and ally in their shared opposition to abortion. 

Vucanovich positioned herself early in her House career as a conservative leader, having aligned herself with a group of members such as Newt Gingrich, Bob Walker and Vin Weber who were not content with minority status.  She helped draft two of the ten bills that were part of the Contract with America. She served on the Presidential Debate Commission from 1987 to 1997.

Retirement
After her retirement from elected office, Vucanovich continued to work in politics, mainly serving on external committees. Her daughter, Patricia Dillon Cafferata, has served as Nevada State Treasurer, in the Nevada Assembly, and as District Attorney in three Nevada counties, and is her mother's official biographer.

Death
Vucanovich died twelve days before her 92nd birthday on June 10, 2013.

Governor Brian Sandoval paid tribute to Vucanovich, whom he likened to Margaret Thatcher, "the Iron Lady" of Great Britain:Barbara Vucanovich was the matriarch of her political generation ... Nevada's "Silver Lady". ... First and foremost, however, Barbara was a wife, mother, grandmother and great-grandmother. Her family was always her priority, even as she served the entire Nevada family in the United States Congress.

See also
List of Hispanic and Latino Americans in the United States Congress
Women in the United States House of Representatives

References

External links

 A Guide to the Records of Barbara Vucanovich, collection 1, collection 2, Special Collections, University Libraries, University of Nevada, Reno.

|-

1921 births
2013 deaths
American people of English descent
American people of Irish descent
American politicians of Mexican descent
Female members of the United States House of Representatives
Hispanic and Latino American members of the United States Congress
Hispanic and Latino American women in politics
Manhattanville College alumni
Politicians from Albany, New York
Politicians from Reno, Nevada
Republican Party members of the United States House of Representatives from Nevada
Women in Nevada politics
20th-century American politicians
20th-century American women politicians
21st-century American women
Latino conservatism in the United States